Estadio Olímpico Bicentenario de Villa Tunari, is a multi-use stadium in Villa Tunari, Bolivia. It is currently used mostly for football matches, on club level by local sides Palmaflor del Trópico. The stadium has a capacity of 8,000 spectators.

The construction of the stadium began on 1 December 2013, being stopped in 2015 but restarted in June 2016. The construction ended in 2018, with the stadium being inaugurated on 8 September of that year by president Evo Morales, with a match between Bolívar and The Strongest.

References

External links
Soccerway team profile

Football venues in Bolivia
Buildings and structures in Cochabamba Department